Terje Rypdal is an album by Norwegian jazz guitarist Terje Rypdal that was released by ECM Records in 1971.

Reception
The Allmusic review gave the album three stars.

Track listing

Personnel
 Terje Rypdal – guitar, flute
 Jan Garbarek – tenor saxophone, flute, clarinet
 Ekkehard Fintl – oboe, English horn
 Bobo Stenson – electric piano
 Arild Andersen – double bass, bass guitar
 Jon Christensen – percussion
 Inger Lise Rypdal – vocals

References

ECM Records albums
Terje Rypdal albums
1971 albums
Albums produced by Manfred Eicher